Nikté Alejandra Sotomayor Ovando (born 1 July 1994) is a Guatemalan badminton player. She won the bronze medals at the 2019 Pan American Games in the women's singles, and at the 2021 Pan Am Championships in the women's doubles. Sotomayor will representing her country to compete at the 2020 Tokyo Olympics, as the first ever Guatemalan female badminton player to compete at the  Olympic Games.

Achievements

Pan American Games 
Women's singles

Pan Am Championships 
Women's doubles

Central American and Caribbean Games 
Women's singles

Women's doubles

Mixed doubles

BWF International Challenge/Series (19 titles, 11 runners-up) 
Women's singles

Women's doubles

Mixed doubles

  BWF International Challenge tournament
  BWF International Series tournament
  BWF Future Series tournament

References

External links 
 

1994 births
Living people
People from Retalhuleu Department
Guatemalan female badminton players
Badminton players at the 2020 Summer Olympics
Olympic badminton players of Guatemala
Badminton players at the 2011 Pan American Games
Badminton players at the 2015 Pan American Games
Badminton players at the 2019 Pan American Games
Pan American Games bronze medalists for Guatemala
Pan American Games medalists in badminton
Medalists at the 2019 Pan American Games
Competitors at the 2010 Central American and Caribbean Games
Competitors at the 2014 Central American and Caribbean Games
Competitors at the 2018 Central American and Caribbean Games
Central American and Caribbean Games gold medalists for Guatemala
Central American and Caribbean Games silver medalists for Guatemala
Central American and Caribbean Games bronze medalists for Guatemala
Central American and Caribbean Games medalists in badminton